The 1994 Mid-American Conference baseball tournament took place in May 1994. The top four regular season finishers met in the double-elimination tournament held at Gene Michael Field on the campus of Kent State University in Kent, Ohio. This was the sixth Mid-American Conference postseason tournament to determine a champion. Fourth seeded  won their first tournament championship to earn the conference's automatic bid to the 1994 NCAA Division I baseball tournament.

Seeding and format 
The top four finishers based on conference winning percentage only, participated in the tournament. The teams played double-elimination tournament. Central Michigan claimed the fourth seed over Western Michigan by tiebreaker.

Results

All-Tournament Team 
The following players were named to the All-Tournament Team.

Most Valuable Player 
Tim Fails won the Tournament Most Valuable Player award. Fails played for Kent State.

References 

Tournament
Mid-American Conference Baseball Tournament
Mid-American Conference baseball tournament
Mid-American Conference baseball tournament